, released in North America as Tenchi Muyo! War on Geminar, is a Japanese OVA series that is a spin-off of the Tenchi Muyo! series created by Masaki Kajishima. Produced by AIC Spirits and BeSTACK, the series aired thirteen episodes on pay-per-view network Animax between March 20, 2009 and March 19, 2010. 

It chronicles the story of a young boy named Kenshi Masaki, the younger brother of Tenchi Muyo!'''s protagonist Tenchi, who is transported to the world of Geminar. The story shares some character names and general terms from the anime Photon, another series created by Masaki Kajishima.

A light novel adaptation by Atsushi Wada was published by Fujimi Shobo on August 20, 2009 under their Fujimi Fantasia Bunko imprint. A manga adaptation was serialized in Comic REX and published by Ichijinsha on June 9, 2010, spanning two volumes. At Otakon 2012, Funimation Entertainment announced they had licensed the series for release in North America.

The anime is part of the Tenchi Muyo! Ryo-Ohki continuity, taking place 15 years after the events of Tenchi Muyo! GXP.

Plot
On Geminar, the countries wage wars using Sacred Mechanoids, humanoid exoskeletal weapons that were originally discovered within ancient ruins and developed over centuries. After being tricked by a mysterious organization into participating in an attempt to assassinate Lashara Earth XXVIII, the young ruler of the Shtrayu Empire, he ends up captured after he chooses not to kill her. Deducing enough about Kenshi to interest her and because his abilities make him an extremely valuable property, Lashara decides to take Kenshi under her protection.

Disguised as her attendant, Kenshi travels with her and her bodyguard Chiaia Flann to the Holy Land, a virtually impregnable fortress that serves as an academy to train Sacred Mechanoid pilots (Mechamasters), most of whom are female. With his kindness, tenacity, and skills that vary from carpentry and cooking to advanced survival techniques, Kenshi eventually becomes a celebrity in the academy as well as the object of affection of many female students, making some of the male students envious. However, the same organization that deceived Kenshi is secretly working inside and against the academy, and a worldwide conflict is about to begin.

Characters

Main

Kenshi, the main protagonist of the series, is a 15-year-old, hardworking boy from Earth. He is the younger half-brother of Tenchi Masaki, son of Tenchi's father Nobuyuki Masaki and his second wife and former secretary, Rea. Just like his brother, Kenshi's kindness, strength and courage have led most of the girls he befriends to become infatuated with him. Possibly due to his upbringing around many gifted individuals, Kenshi is a boy of many talents, ranging from swordsmanship to cooking and housekeeping. Though mostly uninterested in romance, it is suggested he might have feelings for Yukine, Aura and Doll/Mexiah.

His Sacred Mechanoid's unique white color implies that he may be the legendary  destined to save the world of Geminar. While in his Sacred Mechanoid, he sometimes enters a berserk state that causes his Sacred Mechanoid to turn black, expand, and become more powerful. This matches a prophecy involving a white warrior and a black warrior who may save or destroy the world; originally the characters thought the black warrior was Doll, but it eventually becomes clear that Kenshi is in fact both.

Lashara is the 12-year-old ruler of the Shtrayu Empire. The sudden death of her father causes her to inherit the throne, but as the series begins she is traveling away to school in the Holy Land. She slowly loses her position of power to Babalun as the series progresses. She is notorious for being extremely thrifty, as her kingdom is currently in debt. She takes Kenshi in as an attendant after he fails to follow through on an attempt to assassinate her, and along with Chiaia she keeps Kenshi's identity a secret until he shows his capabilities in battling the Sacred Mechanoids of Dagmyer. Lashara is the niece of Queen Flora and always refers to herself using the majestic plural. It is hinted that she has romantic feelings for Kenshi, but given her circumstances, she is not allowed to show such emotions. Her name is a reference to Lashara Moon and Photon Earth from Kajishima's earlier work, Photon.

Chiaia is Lashara's personal escort and bodyguard, charged with protecting her life at all costs. She also attends Holy Land Academy to complete her Sacred Mechamaster training, and officially becomes a Sacred Mechamaster at the end of Episode 2. She is very skilled at combat, being able to imitate Kenshi's unusual Sacred Mechanoid fighting style after only seeing it once. She has a crush on her childhood friend Dagmyer, which causes her to ignore clues regarding his schemes until it was too late. She frequently gets upset with both Kenshi (due to his cluelessness) and Lashara (due to her seemingly-reckless schemes), and Chiaia's temper is one of the few things that both Lashara and Kenshi seem to be wary of. While not happy about it, she agrees to go along with Lashara's scheme to hide the fact that Kenshi is both the Sacred Mechanoid pilot that tried to kill her and from another world. Her Sacred Mechanoid is pink and red with a fox-like tail, and uses a longsword as her primary weapon. She realizes she might have feelings for Kenshi when she sees him wearing the pendant with the red cord she made. Another instance is when she is manipulated by Dagmyer to kill Kenshi, but cannot bring herself to do it. Her reactions around Kenshi have caused others to remark that they act like a pair of siblings (with her as the older sister), and despite her complaining that he always causes trouble (and calling him a "moron"), she is ready to risk her own life for Kenshi and (despite her grumbling about it) joins in the chase for him at the end of the final episode.

Maria is the young princess from the country of Havoniwa who currently attends Holy Land Academy along with Lashara. She and Lashara are cousins, but they are not fond of each other and constantly engage in contests of one-upmanship. She, like Lashara, refers to herself with the majestic plural. She is very close to her servant Yukine and is rarely seen without her. Maria is the daughter of Queen Flora, and along with Lashara is frequently embarrassed by her mother's antics. She supports Yukine into having Kenshi fall for her (Yukine), and has recently shown that she too has feelings for him. Her mother has also fallen hard for Kenshi (to Maria's and her own household's profound embarrassment), even to go as far as making herself, Aura and Kenshi engaged, thereby making Kenshi Maria's prospective stepfather. Her family name is a reference to Sir Papacharino Nanadan from Kajishima's earlier work Photon.

Yukine is the faithful personal servant of Maria, with her quiet and shy demeanor hiding both a very talented skillset and expert combat skills; during the attack on the resort, she wields a sword similar to a khanda.  Yukine acts as Maria's primary information-gatherer, and the two of them are able to figure out that Kenshi is the Sacred Mechanoid pilot that attacked Lashara. There is a clear mutual attraction between Kenshi and Yukine, and merely being in close proximity to each other can cause her cheeks to color; there have been two occasions in which circumstances have caused people to mistakenly believe that Kenshi and Yukine have been physically intimate (and it seems that Yukine wouldn't mind in the least!). She is from a clan that protects a temple dedicated to the Choushin, but lets Kenshi compress it into a sword. Her Sacred Mechanoid is a mixture of light colors with moth antennae and a mane armed with a railgun and jets that allows her to travel at supersonic speeds.

Nicknamed , she is a good friend of Lashara (although technically in Lashara's employ), a brilliant inventor and a genius when it comes to heavy artillery and gunpowder (ironically, she can't seem to hit her targets, though she gradually improves throughout the series). While she may appear to be a 15-year-old girl, her actual age is 97 due to difference in time flow at the Barrier Workshop, where she lived prior to moving to the Swan with the others. She later invented the Mechaworker, a steam-powered mechanoid resembling an Uchikoma with greater maneuverability than that which a Sacred Mechanoid would provide. Her Sacred Mechanoid is brown with bull's horns made for heavy combat. Like Lashara and Chiaia, she has feelings for Kenshi, although she usually tries to test her machines' destructive abilities on him.

Lithia is the granddaughter of the current Pope of Geminar and President of The Holy Land Academy's Student Council. She suffers from extreme stress due to driving herself and the intense amount of work she has, and tends to pass out when she's overworked. However, she begins to feel more relaxed and enervated after Kenshi makes her some energy-increasing tea, though her sarcastic nature still remains. She also seems to fear Morga, the former Student Council President because Morga, while extremely talented as a Sacred Mechamaster, does not work well with others and is also something of a lunatic in combat. Only in the last few episodes, although she still refers to Kenshi as a "wild beast", it is shown that she gets flustered around him and even when speaking about him, hinting she may also have feelings for him, and there is no doubt that she has grown to respect Kenshi greatly.

The Dark Elf Princess of the Shurifon Kingdom and a member of the Pilgrimage Route Guard. While she initially shows a very serious and sober personality (of all the girls that interact with Kenshi, she seems the most emotionally mature), it is later revealed that her personality shifts based on the time of day; at certain times such as in the early morning, she has a much more innocent and girlish personality (this is because her kind were summoned by the Senshi Civilization to pilot the Sacred Mechalord, and her time of weakness shows that her people have not yet fully stabilized in this world). Initially, she admires Kenshi's wilderness skills, but grows to develop a romantic interest in him, even going so far as to feed him water mouth-to-mouth after he has passed out and then attempting to confess her feelings; on a few occasions, she and Kenchi have worked well together as a scouting team. When not dealing with school-related tasks, she is nearly always accompanied by two male retainers. Her Sacred Mechanoid is green and brown (forest colors) armed with a crossbow, and has the ability to generate the Dark Elf Field, a powerful force field that can repel any enemy that comes in range; however, using the field is extremely taxing on the user's body.

Holy Land Academy
Students
A quartet of students at Holy Land Academy, each having a crush on Kenshi. Each of the girls is named after a color, represented by their hair color and the Sacred Mechanoids they pilot; Yeliss is named after the color yellow, Bwoole after the color blue, Gryino after the color green, and Wreda after the color red. Out of the four, Wreda appears to be the de facto leader of the group.

A student at Holy Land Academy and Lithia's assistant. It is shown that she has feelings for Kenshi, and her devotion to Lithia is such that she stays by Lithia's bedside while Lithia is recovering from her fever, then later risks her own life to protect Lithia when they are attacked by Dagmyer's cronies in their Sacred Mechanoids and in the battle in the ravine at the re-taking of The Holy Land defeats an enemy Sacred Mechanoid that has the upper hand over Lithia. Her own Sacred Mechanoid is yellow with a puff-tipped tail and a spear as her primary weapon.

A student at Holy Land Academy who is in the same class as Kenshi. He is also a Sacred Mechamaster, but unlike most Sacred Mechamasters who are born in nobility, he was born into a common family, which is highly unusual. He is in love with a young girl named , but because of his Sacred Mechamaster status, he cannot be seen with her (male Sacred Mechamasters are forbidden to have relationships with commoners). He was taken prisoner by Cordyline and her bandit group and later forced against his will to kill Kenshi when Cliff Clees, Lan and the bandits held Hazuki hostage, using a bomb installed on his Sacred Mechanoid's back to take both Kenshi and himself out (taunts from pursuing female ronin hint that he was "raped" by one or more of them). After the failed attempt, he and Hazuki later join Kenshi onboard the Swan following the events of "Barrier Workshop", and Ceres assists in the making of the Tenchi sword.

The Student Council President before Lithia who is now a knight for the Trible Royal Court. She only makes a brief appearance in the anime, but it is hinted that she and Lithia are not on good terms and that everyone who either knows or remembers her is extremely wary of her. Morga was shown to be a strong-headed and reckless Sacred Mechamaster who obliterates anything in her path, regardless of friend or foe. Her Sacred Mechanoid is red and black, and she uses a pair of axes to fight. Lithia states that while Morga is a skilled fighter, she lacks the ability to work as a member of a team.

Faculty

The director of Holy Land Academy and chief administrator of the Holy Land.

A muscular woman who runs the underground operations of the Academy.

One of Hannah's assistants and in charge of Laundry and Room Service at the Academy.

Antagonists
 / Doll  Mexiah 
Doll is one of the three artificial humans created by the Senshi Civilization for the purpose of defeating the last Sacred Mechalord, Gaia. Gaia was defeated only by the sacrifice of one of the three artificial beings. After Gaia's defeat, Doll/Mexiah's memory of the events was erased and she was buried along with the damaged Sacred Mechalord. Doll/Mexiah was eventually unearthed and discovered as an infant with pink hair by Naua Flan, who adopted her with the name Mexiah Flan, and she was raised as Chiaia's older sister. As Mexiah, she is a martial arts instructor at the Holy Land Academy and, unlike her serious sister, is shockingly affectionate toward Kenshi; however, there are also hints of her having lesbian relationships with some of the female students, all of whom worship her.

Doll has little regard for the importance of life, shown when she laughs while trying to kill Aura during an early encounter. Despite this, she feels an attraction to Kenshi that she believes is a remnant of when Mexiah's personality was dominant. When piloting her Sacred Mechanoid, she can easily defeat any opponent except for Kenshi. In the last episode, the merged Doll/Mexiah calls upon Kenshi through their shared bond of being artificial humans to save her from being subsumed by the merged Gaia/Babalan Sacred Mechalord. Doll's Sacred Mechanoid wields a scythe (which doubles as a gun) and later is armed with the retrieved , a massive and indestructible shield with a mouth capable of eating parts of her opponents. Her Sacred Mechanoid's black color implies that she may be the legendary  destined to destroy the world and Kenshi's nemesis. As Mexiah, her Sacred Mechanoid is lavender with a pink lion's mane armed with a launcher.

Doll bears a close resemblance to the character Neju Na Melmas from Tenchi Muyo! GXP and the character D from Dual! Parallel Trouble Adventure in terms of appearance (they all share a child-like appearance) and hair color (green). The child-form Doll also has pink eyes. As Mexiah, her hair and eye color are reversed.

The hot-blooded and hot-tempered son of Babalun (who seems to have a very low opinion of his son's abilities), Chiaia's childhood friend, and a student of Holy Land Academy. He manipulated Kenshi into attempting to assassinate Lashara in the first episode, and is also responsible for recruiting some of the Academy's male students for the invasion of the Holy Land. His Sacred Mechanoid is blue and gold with a sword that can fire energy blasts from the tip and hilt and a shield as its weapons. His primary motive in betraying and attacking the Holy Land seems to stem from the unfair conditions faced by male Sacred Mechamasters, due to the fact that, on account of their scarcity, male Sacred Mechamasters, no matter how talented or powerful, are considered more like breeding stock and therefore given less freedom than female Sacred Mechamasters; he therefore recruits to his cause other male Mechamasters who feel as he does.  His attitude is demonstrated by his refusal to accept help or sound advice from Emera, his cavalier treatment of Cordyline, his manipulation of Chiaia to get her to kill Kenshi and his rough treatment of her after her failed attempt.  In episode 11, he becomes traumatized after nearly being killed by Kenshi's Sacred Mechanoid in berserker mode and seeing Cliff Cleese hurled to his death in the process, but gradually recovers in the following episode. In the final episode, he finally acknowledges Kenshi's skill after he loses to him in a duel. At the end of the story, it's hinted that he's become infected by Babalun's core jewel.

He is the first male Sacred Mechamaster at Holy Land Academy to be wooed over to Babalun's cause by Dagmyer. It is not sure just how talented he is, but he clearly lacks battle experience since like the other male turncoats he is very arrogant when he thinks he has the upper hand but terrified and unable to fight back powerfully when facing a superior opponent (namely Kenshi), even screaming, begging for mercy and fleeing in terror. His Sacred Mechanoid is green and pink and does not seem to have any special weaponry. Acting on information from his uncle, a former Councilman of Havoniwa who fled to save his own skin when Havoniwa was attacked, Cliff originates the plan to force Ceres to kill Kenshi.  Kenshi goes into berserker mode on learning that his friend was tormented into doing this and literally tears Cliff's Sacred Mechanoid apart, finally hurling him down a chasm. Cliff's last words before he falls to his death are "It wasn't supposed to be like this!"

 and Alan Neil 
These two male Sacred Mechamasters are recruited by Dagmyer and act as his lieutenants.  Although possibly strong fighters, they are easily defeated by Kenshi, and later when Lan takes charge after Dagmyer's collapse and female ronin are recruited into the Babalun forces, they are pushed to the rear by the same apparent lack of respect towards male Mechamasters that they were supposed to be fighting against to the extent that they become more observers than fighters. In the final battle between the Holy Land students led by Lithia and the Babalun ronin forces, they deliberately choose not to fight and are taken into custody after the battle.

Ulyte is Babalun's younger brother, Dagmyer's uncle and one of the most popular instructors within the Academy; he seems to have a different intent for invading the Holy Land than his older brother. His personality is extremely friendly and easy-going, even a little hedonistic, which serves to conceal a keen and penetrating intelligence. It is later revealed that he is an entity created by one of the Core Crystals, which later created the alternate being/personality of Rea Second. This duality is hinted at being the cause of his physical weakness, which is partially cured by Kenshi's herbal tea.

The chancellor (later Prime Minister) of the Shtrayu empire, Dagmyer's father, Ulyte's older brother, and the main antagonist of the series. He is the one who planned the invasion of the Holy Land so he could obtain the Sacred Mechalord Gaia and the Shield of Gaia within. It is later learned by the Church that Babalun wants not only Shtrayu and the Holy Land, but Havoniwa, Shurifon, and possibly the entire world of Geminar to himself. He later merged with Gaia to defeat Kenshi, only to meet his destruction at the hands of Kenshi and Ulyte, where it was later revealed that he is actually an entity created from the implantation of one of the Core Crystals, his Core Crystal having been the Core Crystal of the original pilot of Gaia MechaLord who's went rogue all those millennia-ago; a fragment of his Core Crystal was soon picked up by Dagmyer following his defeat.

 and Cordyline Lan 
The mother/daughter leaders of a group of bandits. Cordyline is a 38-year-old ronin Sacred Mechamaster who went rogue because of her short operational limits when piloting a Sacred Mechanoid; her Sacred Mechanoid is purple with lavender pauldrons and gauntlets and her weapon is a pole-axe that can also fire fiery signal flares. Her daughter Lan is a sarcastic and rebellious teenager who takes her job seriously (though she is not as serious as her mother) and views both Emera and Doll with contempt; she is also extremely ambitious and the most ruthless of all the antagonists (including not hesitating to order the slaughter of an entire Church ship's crew even though they had already surrendered). Lan originally believes Kenshi to be a thief like herself after he foils her attempted pickpocketing, and asks him to join her; Kenshi good-naturedly rejects her offer, causing her to grumble that he's been "domesticated". Originally planning to kidnap Ceres and Dagmyer in Havoniwa, they and the rest of the bandits were later recruited by Dagmyer to participate in the invasion of the Holy Land, Cordyline becoming Dagmyer's lover. Cordyline piloted a purple Sacred Mechanoid that was eventually crushed by Kenshi and was later killed when the Meteor Fall in Havoniwa (which she and her crew had hijacked) collapsed and crashed after Kenshi took down one of its supports, leaving her daughter to take command.  Lan has an enormous ego, demonstrated by showing growing contempt for Dagmyer, taking control of the ronin forces after he suffers his emotional collapse and continually believing that she and her bandits will triumph even in the face of her continual defeats at the hands of Kenshi and his comrades.  After her total defeat at the checkpoint in the final battle, she is seen at the end of the series going after Dagmyer, attempting to kill him in order to re-establish her reputation, only to meet her end by Emera.

Dagmyer's right-hand/servant and a Sacred Mechamaster. She has feelings for Dagmyer (who does not reciprocate and who barely even acknowledges her) and appears to be far more skilled than him; she manages to save him from some falling rubble while Kenshi (with Mexiah in his arms) is escaping from Wahanly, Lithia, Aura, Chiaia, Maria, and Yukine (who were chasing them on board Wahanly's Mechaworker prototype), and again from near-death during Kenshi's rampage in his Sacred Mechanoid. She shows concern for Dagmyer and his honor as the show progresses; her own sense of honor is far more evident than his when she voices her concerns about his hiring Lan and the other bandits, Lan's continuing and growing reckless behavior and the dishonorable methods Dagmyer uses against Kenshi. She regards Kenshi as someone who is kind and is grateful to him for helping Dagmyer change his ways at the end. At the end of the final episode, she kills Lan who is attempting to kill Dagmyer. Her Sacred Mechanoid is red and pink and equipped with a gunblade.

Others
Lashara's attendants, with Mahya being the oldest and most mature of the three; Mahya also acts as a personal and trusted councilor to Lashara.  When Kenshi accepts the role of Lashara's attendant, Mahya's intuition tells her that this has been an historical moment. Angela and Vanessa may have a crush on Kenshi, as they both admit that he's cute. They also serve as part of the Swan's crew.

Two-tailed, Cabbit-like creatures that also double as security alarms due to their piercing meows. For some strange reason, they appear to be attracted to Kenshi (in episode 4, they are also attracted to the crystal from Ryo-Ohki's ship when Ulyte analyzed it); Kenshi is many times during the series compared to, and even called (by Chiaia mostly), a koro.

 / 

A member of the Church whose alter ego is Neizai One, a mysterious masked woman working under Ulyte's orders with an unknown agenda. As Rea, she briefly joined Lashara's group after the Head Church's headquarters was destroyed by Doll, but she later shows her true colors at the Barrier Workshop by stealing a mysterious object which Naua described as being the only way to destroy Gaia. Her Sacred Mechanoid is grey with a cape and a mask with active camouflage armed with a large sniper rifle. She shares the same civilian name as Kenshi's mother, also named Rea.

The Queen of Havoniwa, Maria's mother and Lashara's aunt. While she may appear polite and modest at first glance, she is in reality a hedonistic woman. This causes Maria and Lashara to be frequently embarrassed by her antics (and is one of the few points in which they are entirely in agreement with each other and work together). At one point, in episode 6, they attempted to get retribution by using Kenshi's hypnotized state on her, in which he gives massages that can cause intense orgasms (sometimes hours or days after they are delivered, causing the young girls deep embarrassment since even a slight touch after the massage will cause them to have more intense orgasms). Unfortunately, to Lashara and Maria's shock, it backfired when they realized that the Queen enjoyed it a great deal. As a result afterwards, Flora developed a huge crush on Kenshi. Flora is also shown to be a great pilot when she tested Wahanly's Mechaworker in the forest. She later defends the Holy Land in the invasion plotted by Babalun, with a train equipped with two cannons in each car and a giant cannon hidden in the engine. She had no idea that Kenshi was a Sacred Mechamaster, but when she found out this only increased her passion for him, even more so as to want to have some "one on one" time with him (to Lashara and Maria's dismay).

Naua is Chiaia's father and a leading member of the Barrier Workshop. He was the one who found the Sacred Mechalord and Doll in the ruins of what once was a highly advanced civilization prior to Chiaia's birth. Upon finding Doll in the ruins, he adopted her as Mexiah, who would later be Chiaia's adoptive sister. When Kenshi and the rest of the Swan's crew finally arrive, he reveals the history of the Senshi Civilization, the Sacred Mechalord Gaia, and how Doll came into being. The tests on Kenshi by his team prove that Kenshi is somehow connected to the third artificial human.

Aura's father and the ruler of the Shurifon Kingdom, as well as the kingdom's strongest Sacred Mechamaster. He challenges Kenshi to race to see if he is truly capable of leading his men to battle; after he loses to Kenshi's ability, he announced his intention for Kenshi to marry Aura, to her delight. Later, when the King and Flora come on the Swan, they teasingly suggest  that Kenshi marry both Aura and Flora in an effort to unite the three kingdoms.

The leader of the Church and Lithia's grandfather, with his first name being Gen. He is a very understanding and kind person who tries to find the best solution which does not lead to war. He has shown great respect for Kenshi not only as a Sacred Mechamaster of Light but also as the man who looked after his granddaughter when she collapsed and as the unifyer of all the Holy Land students. It is hinted that he knows Lithia has feelings for Kenshi.

The leader of Yukine's home village in Havoniwa. He is extremely devoted to tradition and it takes drastic measures to cause him to change his mind.

Terminology

General

Aho is a form of energy that permeates the air of Geminar and used to power the Sacred Mechanoid.

Seas of Ena are low-altitude areas where the Aho is so thick that allows flying ships to transit there.

Sacred Mechamasters are the guardians of the Holy Land and the only people qualified to pilot Sacred Mechanoids. Most of the Sacred Mechamasters are female, though there are some male Sacred Mechamasters (such as Dagmyer and Ceres) and they're considered rare in numbers. Female Sacred Mechamasters have the freedom of marriage and relationships if they fulfill their duties, which is to produce more Sacred Mechamaster breeds. Male Sacred Mechamasters, however, cannot due to their scarcity and are usually forced to engage in marriages of convenience, and in ancient times, the semen of a male Sacred Mechamaster was a high-priced item. To obtain this ability, a Sacred Mechamaster has to be baptized by the Church. Unemployed Sacred Mechamasters, like Cordyline, are called ronin Sacred Mechamasters. Some female Sacred Mechamasters wear unique tight-fitting (and sometimes revealing) bodysuits underneath their clothing that protects them from the Aho emitted in the Sacred Mechamasters' cockpit and the Moving Armor.

The main factor that distinguishes a Sacred Mechamaster from a regular human is their ability to endure proximity to Aho energy, which is used to power the Sacred Mechanoid. Ulyte explains that, while fighting skill can be enhanced through training, a Sacred Mechamasters' level of endurance is something they are born with, and therefore cannot be changed. Sacred Mechamasters are limited by the amount of time they can endure an Aho field, called the operational limit. Sacred Mechamasters cannot pilot a Sacred Mechanoid for longer than their operational limit.

Ancient and powerful humanoid constructs that were built by an ancient race called the Senshi. , the only surviving Sacred Mechalord, was unearthed intact (although immobile) by the Shtrayu Empire, and was mainly used as a decoration before the arrival of Kenshi triggered a response from it. It was revealed that the Senshi civilization was completely destroyed by Gaia.

Humanoid mecha that are powered by an energy source called Aho. They usually reside in egg-like cocoons until they're activated. To enter a Sacred Mechanoid, a Sacred Mechamaster places their palm on the cocoon. After the palm is read, the Sacred Mechamaster is then encased in a sphere as they travel to the chest cavity. As soon as a pilot in the cockpit activates it, the Sacred Mechanoid breaks from the cocoon, which then forms the armor (and tail if the Sacred Mechamaster is powerful) depending on who is in the Sacred Mechanoid. Normal people cannot be taken inside the cockpit due to the high amount of Aho radiated inside.

A weakness for Sacred Mechanoids is due to their human anatomy, they are vulnerable to pressure points, which was demonstrated when Kenshi paralyzed Cordyline's Sacred Mechanoid using one of Wahanly's Mechaworker. Another weakness is that if the pilot passes their operational limits or if one of the energy reactors (the rings on a Sacred Mechanoid's back and forearms) either break or go out of control, the Sacred Mechanoid will then revert to its cocoon form. According to Aura, Sacred Mechanoids are a cost-effective alternative to raising armies or building heavy artillery to defend their homelands. To repair a damaged Sacred Mechanoid using Aho, a Sacred Mechamaster has to undergo being baptized by the Church in order to repair them. Otherwise, the damaged Sacred Mechanoid has to be sent to the Church directly for repairs. To maintain the balance of power in each country, the Church can only supply a certain number of Sacred Mechanoids to each country to prevent further power struggles.

Suits of Aho-powered armor that Sacred Mechamasters-in-training use to train. When it is hit, the site of impact turns red and it affects the armor's movement based on the damage received. They are later modified by Wahanly to run on steam power for a limited time (only 30 minutes) should the cord supplying the Aho be removed.

Four-legged mechanoids resembling Uchikomas that are powered by steam instead of Aho. Invented by Wahanly, Mechaworkers provide much greater maneuverability than what a Sacred Mechanoid provides and can be equipped with various gunpowder weapons, though it will hamper its high maneuverability. It is also proven to be more efficient than Sacred Mechanoids without Ena's Draft. In episode 12, Lan and her group of bandits are seen with grey Mechaworkers attacking Chiaia and Aura while Kenshi is compressing the rock used to form the Tenchi-ken, most likely based on the plans Emera stole from Wahanly's workshop in episode 4.

Locations and Organizations

The home country of Lashara and Chiaia prior to moving to the Holy Land. Shtrayu lacks some technological advances, as quoted by Maria, so it relies on using the technologies of other countries such as Havoniwa. It is also the place where the Sacred Mechalord and Doll were unearthed. Shtrayu's past ruler, Lashara's father, died prior to the series, leaving Lashara to become his successor. However, Lashara slowly loses her position of power to Babalun after his promotion to Prime Minister.

An impregnable fortress made in the image of the Choushin goddess. In the Holy Arena, pillars and Ena's Draft are placed as challenging obstacles for the most skilled Sacred Mechamasters, though Kenshi is able to maneuver through them with ease. According to Lashara, winning the Holy Tournament is the greatest achievement for a Sacred Mechamaster. It was later invaded and conquered by Babalun, who was after the Shield of Gaia that was buried underneath and Gaia itself, but was later reconquered following Babalun's defeat.

The homeland of Flora, Maria, and Yukine, and one of the more technologically advanced countries in comparison to the others. In Havoniwa, there is a welcome ceremony in the form of a pillow fight, where the competitors are to pull the sashes off of their opponents' yukata and the last person standing wins. Their main defense is the  a floating fortress that drops meteor-sized rocks to destroy their invaders. It is stated in the anime that the main city that was destroyed by Dagmyer's forces was actually its governing area and there was little to no residents in the area so it was a small loss to Havoniwa. It also has an underground city in case their main city is destroyed. Havoniwa's capital was destroyed by Doll, but its people managed to find refuge in the underground city.

Also like Aura, their personalities shift based on the time of day, which is described by others as their . In Shurifon, there is a rare mushroom that can be sold for a huge fortune (Kenshi found four during the series' run), and it is often used as a gourmet ingredient in the royal courts. Also in Shurifon, there is an event called the Stew Battle, where the contestants find ingredients from the forest to make a stew. The winner is determined by a judge and the person with the most delicious stew wins. Shurifon was the first of the countries to be destroyed by Dagmyer's forces. It is later revealed by Naua that Shurifon's people were brought to Geminar by the Senshi Civilization in ancient times to pilot the Sacred Mechalord, and their weak periods are actually side effects of trying to adapt to the new world.

The main overseers of Geminar. They are the remnants of the Senshi civilization and are well-aware of the dangers of Sacred Mechanoids. They tried to prevent the introduction of Sacred Mechanoids into the current world but had no choice once the Sacred Mechalord was unearthed in the Shtrayu Empire. To prevent the occurrence of an arms race of the kind that destroyed the Senshi civilization, the Church decided to allot a fixed number of Sacred Mechanoids and Sacred Mechamasters to each country to maintain a balance. The Church was shown to have superior technology, such as teleportation pads, apart from monopolizing the construction and repair of Sacred Mechanoids.

An area outside of the Draft of Ena where Sacred Mechanoids and other devices powered by Aho no longer function. It is far less advanced than most of the countries that use the Draft of Ena, and it is said that the people living there are isolated socially as well as physically.

An ancient civilization on the world of Geminar. The Senshi civilization was world-wide and unified, with individual units such as cities and villages. Naua Flan explains that the Senshi civilization created the Sacred Mechanoids, not for war, but for sports and other athletic competitions. Eventually, the Sacred Mechanoids were used for gladiator-like fight events, and the Sacred Mechamasters became an elite class. Massive technological advancements were made to the Sacred Mechanoids as people tried to one-up their opponents. As the battles between Sacred Mechanoids grew more fierce and the number of Sacred Mechamaster fatalities increased, the expertise and fighting instincts of the Sacred Mechamasters were downloaded onto crystals (called ) and embedded into newer Sacred Mechamasters to preserve them. Over time, the accumulation of fighting skills and bloodlust in the crystals caused the Sacred Mechanoids to go on a rampage. These rampaging Sacred Mechanoids were labelled as Sacred Mechalord because of their overwhelming power. The human remnants managed to disable the Sacred Mechalord, but were too late to save their civilization, which had split into several groups as the people fled the Sacred Mechalord.

Media

AnimeIsekai no Seikishi Monogatari was produced by AIC and BeSTACK under the directorship of Koji Yoshikawa, with the script written by Hideki Shirane, characters by Hajime Watanabe, music by Akifumi Tada, and produced by Shoji Ohta, Yasuo Ueda, and Yoshiyuki Matsuzaki, respectively. Thirteen episodes aired in Japan between March 20, 2009 and March 19, 2010 on Japan's Pay-Per-View television channel Animax. The episodes were later released on DVD and Blu-ray by VAP between May 22, 2009 and May 26, 2010. A Blu-ray box set was later released on May 18, 2011. At Otakon 2012, North American distributor Funimation Entertainment announced they have licensed the series under the title of Tenchi Muyo! War on Geminar.

The opening theme for the series is "Follow Me" by Japanese-Canadian pop singer Seira Kagami featuring Sound Around, while the ending theme is "Destino" (Italian for "Destiny") by Alchemy+. A maxi single for the opening theme was released by VAP on January 14, 2010.

Light novel
A light novel adaptation of the series written by Atsushi Wada and illustrated by Katsumi Enami was released on August 20, 2009 by Fujimi Shobo under their Fujimi Fantasia Bunko imprint.

Manga
A manga adaptation illustrated by Bau was serialized on the June 2009 issue of Comic REX''. Two volumes were released on June 9, 2010 by Ichijinsha. The manga follows a slightly different storyline from the anime, though its plot remains the same.

References

External links
Official website 
Tenchi Muyo! War on Geminar – The Official Anime Website from FUNimation

2009 anime OVAs
2009 manga
2009 Japanese novels
Anime International Company
Anime with original screenplays
Fujimi Fantasia Bunko
Kadokawa Dwango franchises
Funimation
Harem anime and manga
Isekai anime and manga
Isekai novels and light novels
Light novels
Mecha anime and manga
School life in anime and manga
Shōnen manga
War on Gaminar
Ichijinsha manga